Jolin Tsai (born September 15, 1980) is a Taiwanese singer, songwriter, and actress. Referred to as the "Queen of C-Pop", she is considered one of the most influential figures in Chinese popular culture. She is known for her continual reinvention and versatility in musical style and visual image, and she has achieved great reputation and popularity in the Chinese-speaking world. She maintains control of every aspect of her career, and she is regarded as a key figure in popularizing dance-pop as mainstream music in Greater China. Her works, which incorporate social themes, have generated both commercial success and critical acclaim.

In 1998, Tsai won a television singing competition produced by MTV Mandarin. Her debut album 1019 (1999) made her become an instant hit, and her first girl-next-door incarnation made her a teen idol with a huge teenage fanbase. Her album Magic (2003), which reflected her first musical reinvention, marked the beginning of her dance-oriented musical direction. Her album Dancing Diva (2006), which highly impressed the public with slick dance songs and dazzling dance moves, established her representative status as a dance-pop artist in the Chinese music scene.

In 2009, Tsai founded the company Eternal and began to be completely in charge of her career. Her album Myself (2010) was regarded as one of the most experimental albums in the Chinese music industry. Her album Muse (2012) integrated pop music with pop art and spans mainstream and indie. Her album Play (2014), which incorporated various social themes, further thrust her into the international spotlight. Her album Ugly Beauty (2018), which explores the norm of beauty standard and the bipolarity of human feelings, was considered the leading production in the C-pop music industry.

With sales of over 25 million records, Tsai is the best-selling Taiwanese female recording artist since 2000. Beginning with her 2003 album Magic, each of Tsai's studio albums has been the highest-selling album by a female artist in Taiwan in its year of release, with four of these albums also being the highest-selling album in the country overall in their respective years of release. She has received a total of seven Golden Melody Awards, making her the female dance-pop artist with the most wins. She is one of the highest-paid Taiwanese female artists, and she has featured multiple times on the Forbes China Celebrity 100 list. In 2014, Next Magazine reported that her estimated net worth exceeded NT$2 billion.

Life and career

1980–1998: Early life and career beginnings 
Tsai was born in Hsinchuang City, Taipei County, Taiwan (now Hsinchuang District, New Taipei City, Taiwan) on September 15, 1980. Her father's name is Tsai Chu-chen, her mother's name is Huang Chun-mei, and she has an older sister named Tsai Min-wen. Her father is of Han Chinese descent, and her mother is half Han Chinese and half Taiwanese indigenous Papora. Her father worked as an accountant before opening a factory in Thailand, and her mother raised their two daughters in Taiwan on her own. Her father later returned to Taiwan to operate a Thai migrant worker agency. Tsai attended Hsinchuang Elementary School, Hsinchuang Junior High School, and Chingmei Girls' High School. Since the first grade, she has been among the top three in class almost every semester. She has learned to practice Chinese calligraphy and play piano since elementary school, and she has passed the grade 9 piano exam. She has been interested into participating in extracurricular activities since elementary school. She joined the track and field team of her elementary school, but she later quit due to an ankle injury. She joined the volleyball team of her high school, and she formed a band named Twister with classmates, the band later broke up because their performance was not as good as expected. She performed the Cranberries' "Zombie" at a welcome party of her high school's popular music association in her sophomore year, and she performed Bette Midler's "The Rose" at another high school event in the sophomore year.

Tsai has taken part in singing competitions since high school, and she won in a singing competition organized by her high school and placed second in another competition organized by Broadcasting Corporation of China. In May 1998, she participated in a television singing competition show produced by MTV Mandarin to meet the requirement for a record of extracurricular activity to apply for universities, and she stand out by performing a series of English songs, including Whitney Houston's "Greatest Love of All", Mariah Carey's "Hero", and LeAnn Rimes's "How Do I Live", and eventually won the competition. "It will be great if I could help her produce a record," said one judge Jeff Lee. "She is a born singer, she sings with her talent," said another judge Wawa Chen. Universal Music Taiwan's music director Sam Chen described Tsai looked different on and off stage in the competition, saying: "She looked just like a uniform student when she was off the stage, but she looked like she has great superstar potential when she was on the stage." In March 1999, Tsai signed a recording contract with Universal, and she became the key new artist of the year. Universal arranged a series of courses for Tsai for half a year, including twice-weekly dance course to help her improve stage performance, twice-weekly makeup course to help her do makeup when she was pressed for schedules, and speech training course to help her cope with the press. Additionally, Universal arranged for her to fly to Ireland, Japan, the United States, and the United Kingdom to watch live performances of foreign artists. In June 1999, Tsai was admitted to the English literature major of Fu Jen Catholic University after winning first place in the recommendation and screening test, and she started her four-year career as a "student singer".

1999–2002: 1019, Don't Stop, Show Your Love, and Lucky Number 
On July 16, 1999, Tsai released her debut single "Living with the World" and announced the release of her debut album in early September 1999. On September 10, 1999, Tsai released her debut studio album, 1019. Produced by David Wu, Peter Lee, and Paul Lee, it incorporated genres of pop, hip-hop, R&B, and world music to showcase her musical talent and versatility. It was well received by music critics, who commented that the girlish sentiment exuded from the album filled the vacancy of the girl-next-door singer in the Taiwan music scene at the time, her idol vibe and strength combined with the excellent production made her become an instant hit. It sold more than 450,000 copies in Taiwan. On December 4, 1999, Tsai held the 1019 I Can Concert in Taipei, Taiwan. On March 16, 2000, Tsai released the live video album, 1019 I Can Concert, which chronicled the 1019 I Can Concert.

On April 26, 2000, Tsai released her second studio album, Don't Stop. Produced by David Wu, Peter Lee, Paul Lee, and Chen Wei, it incorporated genres of pop, R&B, hip-hop, rock, and reggae. Her singing skills on the album were better than before, and her ballad performance became more emotional and delicate, while her dance song performance became more free and easy. It was well received by music critics, who commented that the dance tracks, which was flush with positive vibe and cheerful disposition, set her off in a more dance-oriented direction. It sold more than 500,000 copies in Taiwan, becoming the year's second highest-selling album by a female artist and the year's sixth highest-selling album overall in the country. On April 16, 2020, Tsai held the Don't Stop Concert in Taichung, Taiwan. On July 10, 2000, Tsai held the Examinee Night Concert in Taipei, Taiwan. On May 5, 2020, Tsai released the photo book, Nineteen Years, which sold more than 60,000 copies in Taiwan.

On December 22, 2000, Tsai released her third studio album, Show Your Love. Produced by David Wu, Peter Lee, Paul Lee, Chen Wei, and Jae Chong, it features a wide range of musical styles and her maturer musical performance. It was well received by music critics, who commented that it was relatively rich in music styles in the true sense during her Universal period, with a fairly balanced ratio of ballads and dance songs. It sold more than 280,000 copies in Taiwan. On February 25, 2001, Tsai held the Show Your Love Concert in Panchiao, Taiwan. On March 4, 2001, Tsai held another Show Your Love Concert in Taichung, Taiwan. On May 10, 2001, Tsai released the live video album, Show Your Love Concert, which chronicled the Show Your Love Concert in Panchiao, Taiwan. On September 6, 2001, the music video of the song "Fall in Love with a Street" won an MTV Video Music Award for International Viewer's Choice.

On June 28, 2001, Tsai released the Mandarin version of the theme song "Where the Dream Takes You" of the 2001 Disney film, Atlantis: The Lost Empire. On July 7, 2001, Tsai released her fourth studio album, Lucky Number. Produced by David Wu, Peter Lee, Paul Lee, Chen Wei, and Kay Huang, it incorporated genres of pop, R&B, disco, and hip-hop. It was well received by music critics, who commented that it was her most amazing album during her Universal period. On July 14, 2001, Tsai held the Lucky Number Concert in Taipei, Taiwan. In July 2001, Tsai's father Tsai Chu-chen and her former management company D Sound were involved in a financial dispute due to conflicts in understanding of the contract. On August 15, 2001, Tsai and her family held a press conference to announce the termination of the contract with D Sound. Subsequently, D Sound held a press conference to declare Tsai's unilateral early termination of the contract was a breach of contract, but they said they would not file a lawsuit against her for the time being. In early November 2001, Tsai signed a contract with Angie Chai's company Comic Ritz, and subsequently D Sound filed a criminal lawsuit against her. On December 4, 2001, the Taiwan Taipei District Prosecutors Office opened a court session, D Sound accused Tsai's family of defamation and demanded NT$27 million in compensation, while Tsai's family pointed out D Sound was suspected of embezzlement. Lucky Number lacked promotion due to the contractual dispute, and it sold more than 150,000 copies in Taiwan, ranking top 20 in the year's album sales in the country. On November 6, 2001, Universal released Tsai's greatest hits album, Together. On January 21, 2002, Tsai's family and D Sound separately requested arbitration. On April 2, 2002, Universal released Tsai's remix album, Dance Collection. On June 4, 2002, the Chinese Arbitration Association Taipei ruled Tsai must pay a compensation of NT$9 million for the early termination of the contract with D Sound.

2002–2005: Magic, Castle, and J-Game 
On July 23, 2002, Tsai signed a recording contract with Sony. On August 2, 2002, Tsai released the photo book, The Masque of the Princess, the Spirit of Knight, which sold more than 50,000 copies within two weeks in Taiwan. On March 7, 2003, Tsai released her fifth studio album, Magic. Produced by Bing Wang, Jamie Hsueh, Jay Chou, Peter Lee, and Huang Yi, it incorporated genres of pop, disco, funk, hip-hop, and Britpop. It was well received by music critics, who commented that it was the key piece of her first musical reinvention and established her dance-oriented musical direction. It sold more than 1.5 million copies in Asia. In Taiwan, it topped the album sales chart for 10 consecutive weeks and sold more than 360,000 copies, becoming the year's highest-selling album by a female artist and the year's second highest-selling album overall. The album earned three Golden Melody Award nominations, it was nominated for Album of the Year, Tsai was nominated for Best Female Mandarin Singer, and Baby Chung was nominated for Best Music Arrangement for the track, "Prague Square". Eventually, Baby Chung won Best Music Arrangement. On March 9, 2003, the Taiwanese television series Hi Working Girl, where Tsai played the leading role of Fu I-ling, was aired on China TV. On March 14, 2003, Universal released Tsai's greatest hits album, The Age of Innocence. On April 10, 2003, Tsai released the songs "Angel of Love", "Darkness", and "Sweetie" for the 2003 Hong Kong film, Why Me, Sweetie?!. On April 12, 2003, Tsai held the Say Love You Concert in Tainan, Taiwan. On June 14, 2003, Tsai graduated from Fu Jen Catholic University with a bachelor's degree in English literature. On September 15, 2003, Tsai translated the book The English Roses into Chinese for Madonna, and later she translated another five Madonna's books. On September 10, 2003, Tsai released the theme song "Warriors in Peace" of the 2003 Chinese film, Warriors of Heaven and Earth.

On February 27, 2004, Tsai released her sixth studio album, Castle. Produced by Bing Wang, Peter Lee, Jay Chou, Jamie Hsueh, G-Power, and Huang Yi, it incorporated genres of pop, hip-hop, Latin, chanson, heavy metal, and Britpop. It was well received by music critics, who commented that it consolidated Tsai's successful development trend in the Chinese music scene. It sold more than 1.5 million copies in Asia. In Taiwan, it topped the album sales chart for nine consecutive weeks and sold more than 300,000 copies, becoming the year's highest-selling album by a female artist and the year's second highest-selling album overall. On April 17, 2004, Tsai held the It's Love Concert in Taipei, Taiwan. On August 7, 2004, Tsai embarked on her first concert tour J1 World Tour in Shanghai, China. On November 12, 2004, Tsai released the compilation album, J9. On the same date, Universal released Tsai's greatest hits album, Born to Be a Star. On February 8, 2005, Tsai performed the song "36 Tricks of Love" at the CCTV New Year's Gala. On March 9, 2004, Tsai released the book, Jolin's English Diary Book. It sold more than 1 million copies in Asia, with more than 120,000 copies sold in Taiwan.

On April 25, 2005, Tsai released her seventh studio album, J-Game. Produced by Jamie Hsueh, Jack Chou, Bing Wang, and Adia Chang, it incorporated genres of pop, hip-hop, electronic, old school, disco, and Chinese style. It received mixed reviews from music critics, who commented that it for being trendy and pursuing perfection, but also for being vague positioning and lacking in personality. It sold more than 1.2 million copies in Asia. In Taiwan, it sold more than 260,000 copies, becoming the year's highest-selling album by a female artist and the year's second highest-selling album overall. On June 18, 2005, Tsai held the Exclusive Asia Concert in Taichung, Taiwan. On September 9, 2005, Tsai released the Mandarin version of the song "Under the Sea" from the 1989 Disney film, The Little Mermaid. On September 23, 2005, Tsai released the live video album, J1 Live Concert, which chronicled her J1 World Tour in Taipei, Taiwan. It topped the video album sales chart for 12 consecutive weeks in Taiwan. On September 28, 2005, Taiwanese singer Show Lo released the duet "Destined Guy" with Tsai, which was included on Lo's album, Hypnosis Show. On December 30, 2005, Tsai released the book, Jolin's Party. It sold more than 1 million copies in Asia, with more than 150,000 copies sold in Taiwan.

2006–2008: Dancing Diva and Agent J 
On February 16, 2006, Tsai signed a recording contract with EMI. On May 5, 2006, Sony released Tsai's greatest hits album, J-Top. It sold more than 100,000 copies in Taiwan, becoming the year's fifth highest-selling album in the country. On May 6, 2006, Tsai won an MTV Asia Award for the Style Award. On May 12, 2006, Tsai released her eighth studio album, Dancing Diva. Produced by Adia Chang, Peter Lee, Paul Lee, Yuri Chan, Stanley Huang, and Paula Ma, its musical style is mainly based on pop and electronic music, the slick dance songs with dazzling dance moves also reveal a strong exotic atmosphere. It was well received by music critics, who commented that it was variety in content and well produced, and had an extremely high listenability and popularity, which established Tsai's representative status as a dance-pop artist in the Chinese music scene. It sold more than 2.5 million copies in Asia. In Taiwan, it sold more than 300,000 copies, becoming the year's highest-selling album. The album earned three Golden Melody Award nominations, it was nominated for Best Mandarin Album, Tsai was nominated for Best Female Mandarin Singer, and Adia Chang was nominated for Best Single Producer for the track, "Dancing Diva". Eventually, she won Best Female Mandarin Singer and Favorite Female Singer/Group. On July 1, 2006, Tsai held the Pulchritude Concert in Kaohsiung, Taiwan. On September 15, 2006, Tsai embarked on her second concert tour Dancing Forever World Tour in Hong Kong, China. On September 29, 2006, Tsai released the compilation album, Dancing Forever. The duet "Marry Me Today" with Taiwanese singer David Tao included on the album won a Golden Melody Award for Song of the Year. On November 3, 2006, Sony released Tsai's remix album, Favorite. On February 17, 2007, Tsai performed the song "Marry Me Today" with David Tao at the CCTV New Year's Gala. On June 8, 2007, Tsai released her live video album, If You Think You Can, You Can!, which chronicled her Dancing Forever World Tour in Taipei, Taiwan. It sold more than 120,000 copies in Taiwan, becoming the year's highest-selling video album in the country. On September 19, 2007, Sony released Tsai's greatest hits album, Final Wonderland.

On September 21, 2007, Tsai released her ninth studio album, Agent J, which was produced by Adia Chang, Paul Lee, Michael Lin, Jamie Hsueh, Paula Ma, Lars Quang, Nik Quang, Rene Prang, and Gabriel Ssezibwa. It received mixed reviews from music critics, who commented that it retained Tsai's adventurous way and diverse musical styles, but lacks freshness and melodicity. It sold more than 3 million copies in Asia. In Taiwan, it sold more than 200,000 copies, becoming the year's highest-selling album. Adia Chang won a Golden Melody Award for Best Single Producer for the track, "Agent J", and Andrew Chen won a Golden Melody Award for Best Music Arrangement for the same track. It was released alongside the film of the same name, which premiered on September 5, 2007 and starred actors Kim Jae-won, Stephen Fung, and Carl Ng. On October 21, 2007, Tsai held the Agent J Concert in Tamsui, Taiwan. On November 21, 2007, Kylie Minogue released the duet "In My Arms" with Tsai, which included on the Asian special edition of Minogue's album, X.

On February 29, 2008, there was a personnel change in EMI Greater China. On March 26, 2008, it was reported that the withdrawal from the entire Asian market of EMI would be occurred after Easter of the year. On July 18, 2008, Tsai received a Butterfly Award from Taiwan's Ministry of Labor for her outstanding achievement in the entertainment industry. On August 3, 2008, Norman Cheng, the former president of EMI Asia, announced that he would acquire all the shares of EMI Greater China, including Taiwan's EMI, Hong Kong's Gold Label, and China's Push Typhoon, then he would found a new company named Gold Typhoon, and all former EMI artists' contracts would automatically be transferred to Gold Typhoon. On October 31, 2008, Tsai released the book as well as cover album, Love Exercise, which was produced by Peter Lee, Paul Lee, Adia Chang, Daniel Bi, Paula Ma, and Jim Lee. It was scheduled to be released on March 7, 2008, but it was forced to be postponed due to the personnel change in EMI and the withdrawal from the entire Asian market of the label. It was poorly received by music critics, who commented that the original songs are way too classic but the production lacks creativity. It sold more than 30,000 copies in Taiwan without any promotion, becoming the year's highest-selling Western-language album in the country.

2008–2018: Butterfly, Myself, Muse, and Play 
On December 16, 2008, Tsai signed a recording contract with Warner. On February 27, 2009, Gold Typhoon released Tsai's greatest hits album, Jeneration. On March 27, 2009, Tsai released her tenth studio album, Butterfly, which was produced by Adia Chang, Paul Lee, Peter Lee, and Paula Ma. It was poorly received by music critics, who commented that the tracks were popular but lack surprise, sincerity, and breakthrough. It was pre-ordered more than 120,000 copies in Taiwan, becoming the country's most pre-ordered album of all time. It sold more than 1 million copies in Asia. In Taiwan, it topped the album sales chart for six consecutive weeks and sold more than 210,000 copies, becoming the year's highest-selling album. On March 28, 2009, Tsai embarked on the Butterfly Campus Tour in Hsinchu, Taiwan. It was originally scheduled to perform ten shows, but the remaining shows were canceled after four shows due to her recurring injury. On May 9, 2009, Tsai held the Butterfly Concert in Taichung, Taiwan. On May 24, 2009, Tsai held the Slow Life Concert in Taipei, Taiwan. On October 9, 2009, Tsai released the live video album, Love & Live, which chronicled both Butterfly Concert and Slow Life Concert. On October 15, 2009, Tsai founded the company Eternal with her manager Ke Fu-hung to manage her day-to-day business affairs and coordinate the production and enforcement of copyright for her sound recordings and music concerts. On April 27, 2010, Tsai released the theme song "Heartbeat of Taiwan" of the Taiwan pavilion at Expo 2010 in Shanghai, China.

On August 13, 2010, Tsai released her eleventh studio album, Myself, which was produced by Andrew Chen, Adia Chang, and Paula Ma. It received mixed reviews from music critics, who commented that it established a new benchmark for Chinese dance music albums, but has an imbalance between commerciality and musicality. It sold more than 65,000 copies in Taiwan, becoming the year's highest-selling album by a female artist and the year's fourth highest-selling album overall in the country. The music video of the track "Honey Trap" was nominated for a Golden Melody Award for Best Music Video. On December 24, 2010, Tsai embarked on her third concert tour Myself World Tour in Taipei, Taiwan. On July 12, 2012, Tsai released the book, Living Slim, which sold more than 120,000 copies in Taiwan. On August 28, 2012, Sony released Tsai's greatest hits album, Ultimate.

On September 14, 2012, Tsai released her twelfth studio album, Muse. Produced by Michael Lin, Peggy Hsu, JJ Lin, and Tanya Chua, it integrated pop music with pop art, with music styles spanning mainstream and indie. It was well received by music critics, who commented that it's worthy of repeated listening and has depth. It sold more than 100,000 copies in Taiwan, becoming the year's highest-selling album by a female artist and the year's third highest-selling album overall in the country. The album earned four Golden Melody Award nominations, it was nominated for Best Mandarin Album, Tsai was nominated for Best Female Mandarin Singer, the track "The Great Artist" was nominated for Song of the Year, and the music video of the track "The Great Artist" was nominated for Best Music Video. Eventually, "The Great Artist" won Song of the Year. On October 19, 2013, Tsai released the live video album, Myself World Tour, which chronicled her tour of the same name in Taipei, Taiwan. On May 19, 2014, Tsai released the song "Now Is the Time", which was included on the album, Pepsi Beats of the Beautiful Game. On June 13, 2014, Tsai released the theme song "Kaleidoscope" of the 2014 Chinese film, Tiny Times 3. On August 27, 2014, Tsai released the song "Be Wonderful Together" for the joint campaign of Pepsi and Tmall. On October 31, 2014, Tsai became one of the judges for the Chinese television singing competition show, Rising Star.

On November 15, 2014, Tsai released her thirteenth studio album, Play. Produced by Starr Chen, Andrew Chen, Tiger Chung, JJ Lin, and Michael Lin, it broke away from the framework of traditional Chinese albums with rich musical contents and all-encompassing themes. It was well received by music critics, who commented that it brought international awareness to the world-class quality of Chinese dance music. It sold more than 85,000 copies in Taiwan, becoming the year's highest-selling album by a female artist and the year's fourth highest-selling album overall in the country. The album earned 10 Golden Melody Award nominations, and it is one of the three most nominated albums in the award's history. The album was nominated for Best Mandarin Album and Best Vocal Recording Album, the track "Play" was nominated for Song of the Year, the music videos of the tracks "Play", "We're All Different, Yet the Same", and "I'm Not Yours" were nominated for Best Music Video, Alex Ni and Starr Chen were nominated for Best Music Arrangement for the track "Play", Starr Chen was nominated for Best Single Producer for the track "Play", Andrew Chen was nominated for Best Single Producer for the track "Lip Reading", and Aaron Nieh was nominated for Best Album Packaging. Eventually, the album won Best Mandarin Album and Best Vocal Recording Album, and Andrew Chen won Best Single Producer. On May 22, 2015, Tsai embarked on her fourth concert tour Play World Tour in Taipei, Taiwan. On December 2, 2015, Tsai won an Mnet Asian Music Award for Best Asian Artist. On February 26, 2016, Tsai voiced Judy Hopps in the Taiwan's dubbed version of the 2016 Disney film, Zootopia. On September 30, 2016, Tsai collaborated with Swedish DJ Alesso to release the single, "I Wanna Know". On October 31, 2016, Tsai collaborated with Taiwanese producer Starr Chen to release the single, "Ego-Holic". On May 12, 2017, Tsai released the single "Give Love" for a Mother's Day campaign by Da Ai Television. On June 20, 2017, Tsai collaborated with Dutch DJ Hardwell to release the single, "We Are One". On November 20, 2017, Tsai released the theme song "On Happiness Road" of the 2017 Taiwanese film of the same name. On December 29, 2017, Tsai released the theme song "Stand Up" of the 2018 Chinese film, Monster Hunt 2. On January 30, 2018, Tsai released the live video album, Play World Tour, which chronicled her tour of the same name in Taipei, Taiwan. It became the year's highest-selling video album in Taiwan. On June 12, 2015, Tsai released the theme song "The Player" of the video game, Dungeon & Fighter.

2018–present: Ugly Beauty 
On December 26, 2018, Tsai released her fourteenth studio album, Ugly Beauty. Produced by Starr Chen, Razor Chiang, Howe Chen, Øzi, and Tsai herself, it incorporated genres of pop, hip-hop, electronic, reggae, rock, and R&B, and It explores the norm of beauty standard and the bipolarity of human feelings. It was well received by music critics, who commented that it was the leading production in the C-pop music industry. As of September 26, 2022, it sold more than 800,000 digital copies in China, becoming the highest-selling digital album by a female Hong Kong/Taiwan artist of all time. In Taiwan, it topped the album sales chart for eight consecutive weeks and became the highest-selling album of 2019. The album earned eight Golden Melody Award nominations, it was nominated for Album of the Year, Best Mandarin Album, and Best Vocal Recording album, the track "Womxnly" was nominated for Song of the Year, the music videos of the tracks "Ugly Beauty" and "Lady in Red" were nominated for Best Music Video, Tsai was nominated for Best Female Mandarin Singer, Starr Chen and Tsai were nominated for Best Single Producer for the track, "Ugly Beauty". Eventually, the album won Album of the Year, and "Womxnly" won Song of the Year. On January 21, 2019, Tsai became one of the mentors for the Chinese boy group survival web show, Youth with You. On January 24, 2019, Tsai released the single "Happy New Year Do Re Mi" with Chinese singer Liu Yuning and other TikTok personalities for a Chinese New Year campaign by TikTok. On November 1, 2019, Tsai released the single "Gravity" with Chinese singer Karry Wang. On December 30, 2019, Tsai embarked on her fifth concert tour Ugly Beauty World Tour in Taipei, Taiwan. On April 3, 2020, Tsai released the single "Fight as One" with Hong Kong singer Eason Chan for the COVID-19 pandemic relief. On November 22, 2019, Tsai released the songs "Who Am I", "Turn Back Time", and "Opposite" for the 2020 Chinese television series, The Wolf. On March 21, 2021, Tsai released the theme song "Stars Align" with Dutch DJ R3hab of the video game, PUBG Mobile. On October 21, 2021, Tsai released the single "Equal in the Darkness" with Steve Aoki and MAX. On December 9, 2022, Tsai released the theme song "Untitled" of the 2023 Taiwanese film, Marry My Dead Body.

Artistry

Musical styles 
Tsai has been continuously experimenting with new musical ideas throughout her career. According to Taiwanese singer Sky Wu, "Jolin Tsai has surpassed the general singers and reached the level of a true artist." Tsai is generally known for her dance-pop works, she said: "Every singer has to build their own trademark and distinctiveness, maybe I don't have many representative ballad works, but dance music is my best." Her album 1019 (1999) was dominated by ballads. However, the track "Because of You" foreshadowed dance music as her major musical style in the future. Her album Don't Stop (2000), especially the title track and "You Gotta Know", set her off in a more dance-oriented direction. Her albums Show Your Love (2000) and Lucky Number (2001) were heavily influenced by R&B.

Her album Magic (2003) is regarded as her first musical reinvention. Its overall musical atmosphere was quite different from that in her previous albums, with many of the dance tracks being disco-influenced. Her album Castle (2004) features the tracks, "36 Tricks of Love" and "Priority", which blended dance-pop and heavy metal music. It also features the chanson track, "Love Love Love". Her album J-Game (2005) features a number of dance tracks heavily influenced by electronic music, and the track "Exclusive Myth" is a hybrid of hip-hop and Chinese style.

Her album Dancing Diva (2006) marked the beginning of Eurodance as her main dance music style, and she became a key figure in popularizing dance-pop as mainstream music in Greater China. It also features the electronic rock track, "Nice Guy". Tsai continued to explore Eurodance on her album, Agent J (2007), which established her representative status as a dance-pop artist in the Chinese music scene. The album also features the swing ballad, "Fearless". Her album Butterfly (2009) was heavily influenced by synth-pop for many of the dance tracks, and it features the pop rock track, "Love Attraction".

In October 2009, Tsai founded her own music production company Eternal and began to completely control over her career, she said: "I'm in charge of my music now." Her album Myself (2010), which was the first album with a lot of her own creative ideas, was considered one of the most experimental albums in the Chinese music industry. It features the track, "Nothing Left to Say", a fusion of soft rock and R&B. Tsai said: "When making pop music, we should lead people to accept new styles, new elements, and challenge existing concepts. For many things, fear is the biggest obstacle, fear other people will not like it." The tracks "Fantasy", "Dr. Jolin", and "Beast" on her album Muse (2012) were influenced by trance, progressive house, and techno, respectively. Many of the dance tracks on her album Play (2014) were heavily influenced by trap and dubstep, and the track "Gentlewomen" is a fusion of noise rock and alternative dance. According to Hou Cheng-nan, the professor of the Department of Mass Communication at I-Shou University: "Jolin Tsai has elevated the framework of Chinese dance music and set an unsurpassable high standard." Her album Ugly Beauty (2018) features the title track, which incorporated drum & bass, "Necessarily Evil", a fusion of gothic rock and trap, and "Womxnly", a fusion of tropical house and dancehall.

Voice 
Tsai possesses a mezzo-soprano vocal range. In May 1998, Tsai took part in the singing competition held by MTV Mandarin. She won the competition by performing songs of Whitney Houston, Mariah Carey, and LeAnn Rimes, and it proved that she has good singing skills. "She is a born singer. She sings with her talent," said one judge Wawa Chen. Tsai's voice is very recognizable, but she has been criticized for singing skills since her debut, including thin singing voice and limited vocal range. Taiwanese producer Bing Wang commented: "Her singing skills are moderate, but fortunately her enunciation is distinctive."

Tsai has been nominated for Golden Melody Award for Best Female Mandarin Singer several times, and she won the award for her 2006 album, Dancing Diva. It was the first time that her vocals were recognized by professional music award, but some people still questioned whether her singing ability deserved the award. Liu Ya-wen, the chief convener of the year's Golden Melody Awards jury, commented that Tsai won for her all-around trait, saying: "Jolin Tsai leads the way with her smart and well-sung performance, especially her album Dancing Diva is rich in content, made her break away from being an entertainer and become a real vocalist."

Tsai was nominated for 10 Golden Melody Awards for her 2014 album, Play, but was only not nominated for Best Female Mandarin Singer, because some judge pointed out that the album has problem with excessive pitch correction, so that influenced the voting of other judges. Taiwanese DJ Kyle Cheng stated that he didn't see a problem with pitch correction, saying: "Records are creating unique sound." Tsai's manager Tom Wang also responded: "Jolin Tsai is not a singer who relies on pitch correction, we welcome people to listen to her live performance. I have confidence in her ability." Tencent Entertainment wrote that Tsai's singing skills were often underestimated, adding: "Jolin Tsai has top breath control and high pitch skills, there are not many singers like her who can dance the entire concert without losing breath."

In November 2017, Tsai performed at the 54th Golden Horse Awards, she appeared out of tune when she sang the first song "Tian mi mi", and the later problem was due to a series of songs were dominated by low pitch, she, whose voice is roughly the mezzo-soprano range, didn't sing these songs as well as expected. The performance was criticized by some people, and Tsai readily admitted that it was a mess. However, Tsai's singing skills have been recognized by the general public in recent years, and her live performance skills have also been highly recognized.

Influences 
Tsai has cited Madonna, Whitney Houston, Mariah Carey, and Destiny's Child as her major influence on her career. In May 1998, Tsai took part in the singing competition produced by MTV Mandarin, and she emerged championship by performing songs of Whitney Houston and Mariah Carey. She said that these two singers with high-pitched voices had a great influence on her during her student years.

According to Tsai, the opening yoga performance of her J1 World Tour in 2004 was inspired by the opening yoga performance of Madonna's Re-Invention World Tour in the same year. Tsai stated that she gradually became a fan of Madonna after she noticed that she put on a lot of muscle, she said: "I hope to be a stage artist in the future, just like Madonna, who can lead the way in music, stage, dance, and costume. She is my goal." Former Tsai's choreographer Bruce Chang recalled that Tsai had carefully watched Madonna's stage performance, Tsai said: "She [Madonna] rarely does line dancing, but her every move is powerful, and that's the stage performance I'd look up to." Tsai performed vogue dance in tribute to Madonna in the music video of the track "Honey Trap" from the 2010 album, Myself, she said: "Madonna has always been the artist I admire very much. She is very creative in many aspects. Even though her works generated a lot of controversy at the time, looking back now, I still think her works are very amazing." Madonna brought Eurodance and electronic music into a massive popularity in the American mainstream music scene in the 1980s and 1990s, Tsai stated: "I want to bring the most popular dance music from the West to the Chinese music scene." She added: "When making pop music, we should lead people to accept new styles and new elements, and challenge existing concepts." Taiwanese DJ Mykal said: "Revolution must take place in the mainstream market to have a big effect. Jolin Tsai experiments with new dance music elements as a diva, which is believed that she has the chance to make an impact on the general audience."

Tsai also mentioned that Destiny's Child inspired her a lot before, saying: "I admire them so much, both dancing and singing are real skills." In addition, Tsai has also named artists including Janet Jackson, Kylie Minogue, Sandy Lam, A-Mei, Faye Wong, and Coco Lee as sources of inspiration.

Public image 
Known for reinventing her style and image, Tsai's fashion sense is noted by the general public, and she has constantly set the fashion trend in the Chinese-speaking world. Dubbed as the "Teenage Boys Killer", Tsai was popular among teenage boys for her pure and innocent girl-next-door look in her early years. Since the release of her 2003 album Magic, Tsai mostly dismissed her innocent image for a more sexy look, Japan's Ray magazine named her Taiwan's trendsetter, she said that dressing is to wear people's own personality and characteristics. In May 2006, Tsai received an MTV Asia Award for the Style Award. In December 2006, Yahoo! Taiwan ranked her the most fashionable artist in Taiwan, Tsai won the favor of several fashion magazines' directors and general public, showing people's affirmation of her fashion style. In recent years, Tsai gradually transformed into a more avant-garde style. In October 2016, Vogue wrote: "As a style chameleon, she dresses to suit her mood and the occasion." Since 2007, Tsai has been successively invited to watch the "Big Four" fashion weeks, Met Gala, and Victoria's Secret Fashion Show, making her the first Chinese singer that has been invited to attend all of these notable fashion events. Her fashionable appearance has landed her on the cover of fashion magazines, such as Cosmopolitan, Elle, Harper's Bazaar, Marie Claire, and Vogue. Tsai has also led the trend in nail art. She had featured on the cover of Nail Up! Taiwan, the magazine's president Sigehito Sasaki called her Taiwan's "Queen of Nail Art". Tsai said: "I can't stand to have no color on my nails, I feel insecure without nails painted." FHM Taiwan ranked Tsai top 10 eight times on the "100 Sexiest Women in the World" list in ten years. In 2016, the magazine ranked her first on the list.

Tsai has always been a singer with great commercial value, and she has received huge commercial benefits since her debut. With sales of over 25 million records, Tsai is the highest-selling Taiwanese female artist since 2000. Dubbed as the "Queen of Money-Making", she was the highest-paid Taiwanese female artist from 2004 to 2019 and the second highest-paid Taiwanese female artist in 2020 and 2021. In 2010, Forbes China began reporting on earnings of Chinese celebrities born in Hong Kong, Taiwan, and abroad. She has been ranked top 20 six times on the "Forbes China Celebrity 100" list in ten years, and three of which she was even ranked top 10. As of December 2014, Tsai's net worth was estimated to be more than NT$2 billion. With over 43 million followers on Sina Weibo and 4 million on Instagram, Forbes listed Tsai on the "Asia's 100 Digital Stars", which highlighted her as one of the Asia-Pacific's most influential celebrities on social media.

Having a dedicated fanbase composed mostly by LGBT people, Tsai is considered a gay icon. In 2012, she signed the petition calling for Taiwanese government passing the Marriage Equality Act and legalizing the same-sex marriage in Taiwan, she said: "Any kind of love must support, criticizing the love of others is not in the way of love." Her songs—"Dr. Jolin", "Fantasy", "Gentlewoman", "We're All Different, Yet the Same", and "Womxnly" all cater to the LGBT audience and support same-sex love. In April 2015, Tsai was given Icon Award at the 2nd Asia LGBT Milestone Awards in recognition of her putting aside the pressure of public opinion and using her influence to support LGBT rights, she said: "This award should go to all those who speak up for same-sex equality to bring this issue to the fore." In October 2015, Tsai featured on the cover of Singaporean lesbian-themed magazine, Lezs. In an interview with Lezs, she said: "Singers do not rely on awards or other things, but rely on singing to convey love, so that people get more courage, happiness, and memories, this is the meaning of me on the stage." In June 2017, Billboard wrote: "Tsai has represented same-sex couples and diverse LGBTQ+ lifestyles through her bright pop releases, providing an outlet for diverse representation in the generally conservative Chinese-language music industry." Tsai said: "I don’t intend to become an idol for any specific group of people. All I want to do is to encourage some people by saying things I think to be right, so that they know they are not alone."

Personal life 
Tsai's personal life has been the subject of public attention, and she has had long-term relationships with Jay Chou, Eddie Peng, and Vivian Dawson since her debut. In January 2001, Tsai met Taiwanese singer Jay Chou on the Taiwanese television show, Guess. In December 2001, the two were spotted dining in an izakaya in Shinjuku, Japan, and later they were spotted dating in Taiwan several times. In February 2005, Chou and Taiwanese television presenter Patty Hou were spotted traveling in Shibuya, Japan, making Tsai and Chou's relationship end. After that, Tsai and Chou began to deliberately avoid seeing each other on various occasions. In June 2010, Tsai was invited to be a special guest at Chou's concert in Taipei, Taiwan, and they seem to be back to normal friends.

In January 2007, Tsai and Taiwanese actor Eddie Peng were spotted traveling in London, England, and later they were seen dating in Taiwan several times. In September 2008, Peng had a dispute with his management company, Power Generation, which was suspected of trying to block Tsai and Peng's relationship. In August 2009, Peng's former manager Virginia Liu indirectly confirmed that Tsai and Peng had a more than three-year relationship since the mid 2006, and it was suspected that Peng's mother prevented their relationship from developing due to dissatisfaction of Tsai's reluctance to publicize their relationship.

In July 2010, New Zealand model Vivian Dawson starred in Tsai's music video of the track "Love Player" from the album, Myself (2010). In September 2010, the two were spotted traveling in Tokyo, Japan. Since then, they have been constantly seen dating and traveling around the world. In November 2011, Tsai's father indirectly confirmed the Tsai and Dawson's relationship as well as Tsai had relationships with Jay Chou and Eddie Peng. In February 2013, Tsai and Dawson flew to New Zealand to meet Dawson's parents. In December 2016, Tsai's manager Tom Wang confirmed that Tsai and Dawson's relationship had ended amicably in November 2016.

Legacy 
Tsai's success has made her a pop cultural symbol in the Chinese-speaking world, Tencent Entertainment wrote: "Jolin Tsai has become a symbol of pop music not only because of her music, image, and dance, but also due to her unyielding, fearless spirit, and endless possibilities." NetEase Entertainment wrote: "Perhaps, a few generations from now, when we look back on the C-pop divas of the early 21st century, we will first think of Jolin Tsai and no one else as the benchmark, just as we will never look back on the second half of the 20th century without the shining name of Madonna." Hung Hsiu-chu, the former chairperson of Chinese Nationalist Party, said: "Her artistic achievements have set an unsurpassable standard in the C-pop music industry. The name Jolin Tsai can be said to have accompanied generations of young people through the entire twenty years. All along, I have always admired Tsai's earnest and hardworking personality. All the glory and applause she has received now were accumulated with countless blood, sweat, and tears, which are respectable and highly appreciated!" In April 2010, Tsai was named one of the 10 most influential Hong Kong/Taiwan music figures of the decade by the Top Chinese Music Awards. In December 2016, she was awarded Best Female Singer of the Decade by Migu Music Awards. In May 2019, she was ranked first in the field of fashion style in the survey of "Who Is the Most Influential Woman for the New Generation?" jointly by Elle Taiwan and Taiwan's Cheers magazine. She was also ranked second in both fields of gender issues and life attitude. Cheers wrote: "From a pop singer to a social activist, Jolin Tsai has been consciously showing her energy over the years."

Known as the "Queen of C-Pop", Tsai is credited with popularizing dance-pop as mainstream music in Greater China. Bloomberg Businessweek wrote: "Jolin Tsai started her era with music, and she made the world know the standard of Chinese dance music." Tencent Entertainment wrote: "Jolin Tsai is the most evergreen diva in the Chinese music scene in the past decade. From the girl next door to the 'Queen of Reinvention', the best thing about Jolin Tsai is not her singing skills, but her hardworking attitude as an entertainer." Tsai has also pushed the production of Chinese music videos to a new height. Douban wrote: "Before Jolin Tsai, the influence of a music video was not that big. In Jolin Tsai's era, apart from ordinary shooting work, every outfit was carefully designed along with the scene, and the construction of each scene was carefully considered. The editing and application of various montage also achieved qualitative leaps." Tsai's work has also influenced many other artists of later generations, including Cyndi Wang, Rainie Yang, Angela Chang, A-Lin, G.E.M., Lala Hsu, Eve Ai, Shi Shi, Emma Wu, Yao Yao, By2, Lexie Liu, Meng Meiqi, Wu Xuanyi, Cheng Xiao, Kimberley Chen, Sharon Kwan, etc.

Tsai has exerted positive influence on social issues using her influence in Chinese popular culture. Taiwan's Business Weekly magazine wrote: "Even though her status has dominated the C-pop music industry, Jolin Tsai has never stopped. In the form of performance and dance, he constantly breaks through herself. In her songs, she broke away from the little love and expanded the pattern to social issue, same-sex issue, and feminist issue, Jolin Tsai’s artistic growth led us to see a wider world." Apple Music wrote: "Jolin Tsai’s legacy is built on her tenacity as much as her pioneering vision. Moving on from her first incarnation of sweet idol singer in 1999, she honed her signature slick dance-pop and dazzling moves on albums like Dancing Diva in 2006. But this was just the beginning for the daring artist, who continued to innovate her sound—and became an LGBTQ icon in the process. Songs like “Play” and “Ugly Beauty” are both sharp societal critiques and helped set new visual and creative standards for Mandopop, leaving no doubt about Tsai’s lasting artistic relevance."

Achievements 

Tsai has been nominated for a total of 15 Golden Melody Awards, the equivalent to the Grammy Awards in the Chinese-speaking world, including two Album of the Year, four Song of the Year, four Best Mandarin Album, four Best Female Mandarin Singer, and one Best Single Producer. She has won a total of seven Golden Melody Awards, including one Album of the Year for Ugly Beauty (2018), three Song of the Year for "Marry Me Today", "The Great Artist", and "Womxnly", one Best Mandarin Album for Play (2014), one Best Female Mandarin Singer for Dancing Diva (2006), and One Most Popular Female Singer/Group. She is the dance-pop artist with the most wins and nominations on the Golden Melody Awards, and the Guinness World Records acknowledged her as the artist with the most wins for Song of the Year on the awards. In 2016, Play set the record for the most Golden Melody Award nominations (10 nominations), leading to a tie with Jay Chou's Fantasy (2001) and A-Mei's Amit (2009). In 2018, Ugly Beauty was also nominated for eight Golden Melody Award nominations.

Tsai has received many awards at other Chinese music awards shows, including Beijing Pop Music Awards, CCTV-MTV Music Awards, China Music Awards, Global Chinese Music Awards, Global Chinese Pop Chart Awards, Hito Music Awards, IFPI Hong Kong Top Sales Music Award, KKBox Music Awards, Metro Radio Hits Music Awards, Metro Radio Mandarin Hits Music Awards, Migu Music Awards, Music Radio China Top Chart Awards, My Astro Music Awards, Singapore Hit Awards, Top Chinese Music Awards, Top Ten Chinese Gold Songs Award, and TVB8 Mandarin Music on Demand Awards. Among them, she has received eight Hito Music Awards for Best Female Singer, eight Hito Music Awards for Most Weeks at Number One Album/Song, 10 KKBox Music Awards for Top 10 Singers, one Top Chinese Music Award for Most Influential Musicians of the Decade, and one Migu Music Award for Best Female Singer of the Decade.

Tsai has received awards at international music awards shows, including one MTV Video Music Award for International Viewer's Choice for her music video of "Fall in Love with a Street", one MTV Asia Award for the Style Award, and one Mnet Asian Music Award for Best Asian Artist. She has also received four MTV Asia Award nominations for Favorite Artist Taiwan, one MTV Video Music Award Japan nomination for Best Buzz Asia, one MTV Europe Music Award nomination for Best Asian Act, and one MTV Europe Music award nomination for Best Taiwanese Act. In 2008, Tsai received the Butterfly Award from Taiwan's Ministry of Labor to praise her outstanding performance in the entertainment industry.

With five songs—"Marry Me Today", "Sun Will Never Set", "Honey Trap", "Play", and "Ugly Beauty" topping this chart, Tsai has the most number-one songs on the Hit FM Top 100 Singles of the Year chart. With sales of over 25 million records, Tsai is the highest-selling Taiwanese female recording artist since 2000. Since Magic (2003), each of her studio albums has been the highest-selling album by a female artist in Taiwan in its year of release, and four of the albums—Dancing Diva (2006), Agent J (2007), Butterfly (2009), and Ugly Beauty (2018) were also the respective year's overall highest-selling album in the country.

Other ventures

Endorsements 
Since the launch of her career, Tsai has endorsed a number of internationally famous brands, including Absolut Vodka, Adidas, Always, Bausch & Lomb, BenQ, Bulgari, Crest, Gap, Dr. Jart+, Dungeon & Fighter, Head & Shoulders, Hi-Chew, Intel, Knorr, Lay's, Levi's, L'Oréal, Lux, Max Factor, McDonald's, Mengniu, Mercedes-Benz, Motorola, Nars, Olay, Pepsi, Pony, Puma, Quaker, Rémy Martin, Samsung, Shisedo, Standard Chartered, Swarovski, Taiwan Beer, TalesWeaver, Toyota, Tropicana, Uber Eats, Yamaha, and 7-Eleven.

Tsai has also cooperated with some of the brands to launch collaborative products. In December 2018, Pony announced that Tsai had designed a limited edition of the M100 sneakers, which premiered on December 22, 2018. In July 2019, Gap announced that Tsai had designed six limited edition t-shirts, which premiered on July 25, 2019 and were inspired by the six tracks from her album, Ugly Beauty (2018). On September 19, 2019, Gap launched four limited edition sweatshirts designed by Tsai.

Products 
In September 2007, Tsai and her sister Tsai Min-wen launched the nail polish brand Oops! Jealous, whose products began to be sold on the Taiwanese online shopping website PayEasy, and Tsai focused on developing nail polish's colors and styles. In August 2010, the brand's products began to be sold in the vending machine in Qsquare in Taipei, Taiwan. In October 2011, the products began to be sold in the personal care chain store Watsons in Taiwan. In September 2009, Tsai's sister and her friend opened the nail salon Oops! J&I in Walnut, California. In August 2014, the salon sold to other investor. However, the investor filed a lawsuit against Tsai and her sister for contractual issue in May 2016. Tsai's management company issued a statement saying that Tsai had no business involvement in the salon, and Tsai's sister also issued a statement saying that Tsai had no investment relationship with the salon.

In February 2009, American entrepreneur Ken Erman founded the fashion brand Seventy Two Changes, which was named after Tsai's 2003 album Magic (also as known as See My 72 Changes literally in Chinese), and asked her to be the designer. The brand's goods began to be sold in the department stores in more than 30 cities around the world. Tsai designed 100 pieces of clothing in the first year, making the brand earned about US$1 million. In February 2010, the brand opened its first boutique in the Shanghai Times Square in Shanghai, China. Tsai designed a total of 400 pieces of clothing in the second year, making the brand earned about $4 million. Tsai, who owned 15% of the royalties, has earned about $750,000 solely from the brand over the two years. In February 2011, Tsai's contract with the brand expired, and she chose to end her collaboration with the brand due to conflicting business philosophies between the shareholders in the United States and mainland China.

In October 2015, Tsai and her friend Peggy Chu launched the fondant cake brand named Your Majesty to sell fondant cakes and provide customized fondant cake service on Facebook and Instagram, and Tsai serves as the brand's creative director. From September 28 to October 21, 2018, the brand opened its first brick-and-mortar pop-up store in Chianti Avenue Plaza in Taipei, Taiwan. In December 2018, the brand began to be sold in the coffee shop chain Migu Coffee in Shanghai, China.

Philanthropy 
Tsai has been actively participating in charitable activities and providing assistance through donations and other means whenever disasters occur in the neighboring countries. In September 1999, Taiwan was hit by the 921 earthquake, Tsai donated all the proceeds from the signing session of her 1999 album 1019 for the earthquake relief, and the music video of the track "Living with the World" features the video clips of the relief work after the earthquake and expressed her gratitude for the assistance from all walks of life. In May 2003, when the SARS epidemic broke out globally, Tsai and 85 other artists released the charity single, "Hand in Hand". In the same month, Tsai, on behalf of the 86 artists who sang the song, went to the Taiwan Centers for Disease Control to express sympathies to the medical staff and donated 100,000 copies of the single. In December 2004, Tsai donated anonymously to several charities for the Indian Ocean tsunami relief. In January 2005, Tsai participated in a disaster relief fundraising event organized by Azio TV, where she donated again. In May 2008, Tsai and her friends jointly donated ¥1 million RMB for the Wenchuan earthquake relief. In the same month, Tsai participated in a disaster relief fundraising event organized by China TV. In July 2008, Tsai partnered with the World Vision to endorse the 30 Hour Famine events, and she visited Guangyuan, Sichuan, China to express sympathies to the earthquake victims. In August 2009, Taiwan was hit by the Typhoon Morakot, Tsai and her friends jointly donated NT$3 million. In April 2010, Tsai participated in the charity concert in Beijing, China calling for aid in the education and reconstruction of the Yushu earthquake-stricken area, all the proceeds were donated to the Red Cross Society of China for the Yushu and Wenchuan disaster-stricken areas. In March 2011, Tsai and her management company jointly donated US$50,000 for the Tōhoku earthquake relief. In April 2013, Tsai donated ¥1 million RMB for the Lushan earthquake relief. In July 2013, Tsai donated ¥150,000 RMB through the Sichuan Charity Federation for the reconstruction of elementary schools in the Lushan earthquake-stricken area. In August 2014, Tsai donated NT$2 million for the Kaohsiung gas explosions relief, of which NT$1 million was used for the rescue work of police and firefighters, and the other NT$1 million was used to assist victims affected by the accident. In February 2018, Tsai donated NT$1 million for the Hualien earthquake relief. In January 2020, the COVID-19 pandemic broke out in China, Tsai donated ¥1 million RMB. In April 2020, the COVID-19 pandemic broke out globally, Tsai released the charity song "Fight as One" with Hong Kong singer Eason Chan. In May 2021, the COVID-19 pandemic broke out in Taiwan, Tsai donated NT$1 million to help the Wanhua Welfare Services Center to purchase the first smart constant temperature bento box vending machine in Taiwan.

Tsai has also been enthusiastic about participating in social welfare activities. In June 2004, Tsai donated the RM50,000 proceeds from the signing session of her 2004 album Castle in Kuching, Malaysia to Batu Kawa Min Lit Secondary School for school funding. In November 2004, Tsai donated all the proceeds from the first 100 tickets and NT$50 from each other ticket sold of her J1 World Tour in Taipei, Taiwan to the Ronald McDonald House Charities. In November 2006, Tsai donated NT$50 from each ticket sold of three shows of her Dancing Forecver World Tour in Taipei, Taiwan to the Ronald McDonald House Charities, eventually donating more than NT$10 million. In April 2014, Tsai participated in the Project WAO Charity Concert, and all the proceeds were donated to the City People Foundation. In May 2015, Tsai designed bandages for charity sale, and all the proceeds were donated to the Taiwan Alliance to Promote Civil Partnership Rights. In October 2015, Tsai designed 1,000 fondant cakes for charity sale, and all the proceeds were donated to the Taiwan Alliance to Promote Civil Partnership Rights. In August 2016, Tsai participated in the Love Is King Charity Concert, and all the proceeds were donated to the Taiwan Alliance to Promote Civil Partnership Rights. In September 2016, Tsai participated in the Bazaar Stars Charity Night and donated ¥700,000 RMB to the Bazaar Charity Fund to purchase ambulances for poverty-stricken areas in China. In May 2017, Tsai drew the painting You for charity sale, and the NT$200,000 proceeds were donated to the Taiwan Alliance to Promote Civil Partnership Rights. In October 2017, Tsai partnered with Fendi's "Hong Kong Peekaboo Project" to design a handbag for charity sale, and all the proceeds were donated to the Prader-Willi Syndrome Association in Taiwan. In December 2017, Tsai donated NT$1 million to the Huashan Social Welfare Foundation. In addition, she donated another NT$1 million to the organization privately in 2016. In October 2018, Tsai participated in the One Night for Children Charity Concert, and all the proceeds were donated to the organization. In August 2021, Tsai partnered with the Taiwan Fund for Children and Families to endorse the "End Poverty" campaign and donated NT$1 million to the organization to purchase 50 laptops.

Discography 

 1019 (1999)
 Don't Stop (2000)
 Show Your Love (2000)
 Lucky Number (2001)
 Magic (2003)
 Castle (2004)
 J-Game (2005)
 Dancing Diva (2006)
 Agent J (2007)
 Butterfly (2009)
 Myself (2010)
 Muse (2012)
 Play (2014)
 Ugly Beauty (2018)

Filmography 

 Six Friends (2001)
 Come to My Place (2002)
 In Love (2002)
 Hi Working Girl (2003)
 Agent J (2007)
 Zootopia (2016)

Bibliography 
 Jolin's English Diary Book (2005)
 Jolin's Party (2006)
 Love Exercise (2008)
 Living Slim (2011)

Tours 

 J1 World Tour (2004–2006)
 Dancing Forever World Tour (2006–2009)
 Myself World Tour (2010–2013)
 Play World Tour (2015–2016)
 Ugly Beauty World Tour (2019–2023)

Enterprises 
 Eternal Music Production Co., Ltd.

See also 

 Forbes China Celebrity 100
 Honorific nicknames in popular music

References

External links 

 
 
 

 
1980 births
Living people
20th-century Taiwanese women singers
21st-century Taiwanese actresses
21st-century Taiwanese businesspeople
21st-century Taiwanese women singers
Actresses from New Taipei
Actresses from Taipei
Businesspeople from New Taipei
Businesspeople from Taipei
Cosmetics businesspeople
Dance music singers
EMI Group artists
Entertainment industry businesspeople
Feminist musicians
Fu Jen Catholic University alumni
MAMA Award winners
Mezzo-sopranos
Musicians from New Taipei
Musicians from Taipei
Singing talent show winners
Sony BMG artists
Sony Music artists
Taiwanese businesspeople in fashion
Taiwanese company founders
Taiwanese dance musicians
Taiwanese fashion designers
Taiwanese female dancers
Taiwanese feminists
Taiwanese film actresses
Taiwanese idols
Taiwanese LGBT rights activists
Taiwanese Mandopop singers
Taiwanese Mandopop singer-songwriters
Taiwanese people of Hoklo descent
Taiwanese philanthropists
Taiwanese television actresses
Taiwanese women company founders
Taiwanese women fashion designers
Universal Music Group artists
Warner Music Group artists